The Rocky Mountain Saints: A Full and Complete History of the Mormons is an 1873 book by T. B. H. Stenhouse, in which the author gives a thorough treatment of the origins of the Latter Day Saint movement from the perspective of a former member. The book is critical in tone, and is considered by many Mormons to be anti-Mormon.

The book is notable in that it was the first widely available publication containing a critique of the facsimiles in the Book of Abraham, which was made by the Egyptologist Theodule Deveria.

The book contains the earliest known depiction of Joseph Smith's First Vision.

References

External links 
 Online copy via Google Books
 Online copy via The Internet Archive

1873 books
1873 in Christianity
Books critical of Mormonism
Book of Abraham